Shevaanga or Sibagna is a former Tongva-Gabrieleño Native American settlement in Los Angeles County, California. It was closely situated to the village of Toviscanga. It was the original site of San Gabriel Mission established in 1771, before it was destroyed in a flood and then rebuilt at the nearby village of Toviscanga in 1776.

It lay at an elevation of 430 feet (131 m). It was located near Mission San Gabriel Arcángel and the Whittier Narrows, in the San Gabriel Valley.

See also
Category: Tongva populated places
Tongva language
Spanish missions in California
California mission clash of cultures
Ranchos in California

References

San Gabriel Valley
Former settlements in Los Angeles County, California
Former Native American populated places in California
Former populated places in California
Tongva
Tongva populated places